Tangents is a studio album by American jazz bassist Gary Peacock recorded in Switzerland in 2016 together with pianist Marc Copland and drummer Joey Baron. This is Peacock's final studio album as a leader; he composed five of the eleven tracks.

Reception
Britt Robson of JazzTimes stated "That ambiance of received wisdom, of patient certainty, permeates Tangents." Cormac Larkin in his review for The Irish Times mentioned, "A set of mostly Peacock compositions – with Alex North’s love theme from Spartacus and Miles Davis’s classic Blue in Green thrown in for good measure – veers from ruminative abstraction to tender lyricism to joyous swing without losing the intense focus of three old hands, masters of their respective instruments, who have the courage and the humility to let the music decide where it wants to go." Karl Ackermann of All About Jazz added, "At eighty-two years of age, one need only listen to "Rumblin'" to hear Peacock solo like the ageless wonder that he is."

Derek Taylor of Dusted wrote, "The band’s second date for ECM, Tangents is right on par with the first in presenting each of the three players in the best possible setting, acoustically and creatively. Copland and Baron are significantly younger than their employer and colleague, but seniority registers little if no meaning in the context of music as ageless as this. Peacock is careful not to allow any of the eleven pieces to gather any figurative moss or collected dust. His warm and responsive strings are central in the sound spectrum with frequent solos that fold seamlessly into the trajectories of the tunes without disrupting the flow. Copland and Baron are just as centered..."

Track listing

Personnel 
 Gary Peacock – double-bass
 Marc Copland – piano
 Joey Baron – drums

References 

ECM Records albums
Gary Peacock albums
2017 albums
Albums produced by Manfred Eicher